The Borough of Bedford is a unitary authority area with borough status in the ceremonial county of Bedfordshire, England. Its council is based in Bedford, its namesake and principal settlement, which is the county town of Bedfordshire. The borough contains one large urban area, the 71st largest in the United Kingdom that comprises Bedford and the adjacent town of Kempston, surrounded by a rural area with many villages. 75% of the borough's population live in the Bedford Urban Area and the five large villages which surround it, which makes up slightly less than 6% of the total land area of the Borough.

The borough is also the location of the Wixams new town development, which received its first residents in 2009.

Formation
The ancient borough of Bedford was a borough by prescription, with its original date of incorporation unknown. The earliest surviving charter was issued c. 1166 by Henry II, confirming to the borough the liberties and customs which it had held in the reign of Henry I. The borough became a municipal borough under the Municipal Corporations Act 1835.

The District of Bedford was formed on 1 April 1974 as a merger of the existing borough of Bedford, along with Kempston Urban District and Bedford Rural District. In 1975 the district was granted a royal charter granting borough status as North Bedfordshire. The borough was renamed as Borough of Bedford in 1992. Over half of the former municipal borough of Bedford is unparished. However, Brickhill is a parish. The rest of the district including Kempston is parished.

The Department for Communities and Local Government have reorganised Bedfordshire's administrative structure as part of the 2009 structural changes to local government in England, meaning that Bedford Borough Council became a unitary authority in April 2009. This means Bedford Borough has assumed responsibility in areas such as education, social services and transport which were previously provided by Bedfordshire County Council.

Council and cabinet

Unlike most English districts, Bedford's council is led by a directly elected mayor of Bedford, who has been Dave Hodgson since 16 October 2009.

The first elections for the new unitary Bedford Borough Council were held on 4 June 2009 when 36 councillors in addition to the mayor were elected. Since an electoral review which came into effect for the local elections in 2011, Bedford Borough has had 40 councillors in addition to the mayor.

Since the 2019 elections, Bedford Borough Council’s executive committee (cabinet) is headed by the mayor and includes 10 members from the Liberal Democrat, and Labour groups, and the Independent. Conservative and Green members sit in opposition on the council.

Wards and civil parishes
The urban part of the borough consisting of most of the Bedford/Kempston Urban Area is divided into 13 wards, some of which are also civil parishes:

The wards and constituent civil parishes in the rural part of the borough are as follows:

Premises
From 1892 the council was based at the Town Hall in St Paul's Square, which had previously been part of Bedford School, with parts of the building dating back to c. 1550. Following the abolition of Bedfordshire County Council in 2009, Bedford Borough Council took over the old County Hall on Cauldwell Street, renaming it Borough Hall.

Freedom of the Borough
The following people and military units have received the Freedom of the Borough of Bedford.

Individuals
 Etienne Stott: 11 December 2012.

Military Units
 Bedfordshire and Hertfordshire Regiment: November 1955
 RAF Cardington: 16 July 1959.
 287 Regiment Royal Artillery: 5 May 1963.  
 1st Battalion Royal Anglian Regiment: 1980.
 201 (Hertfordshire and Bedfordshire Yeomanry) Battery Royal Artillery (Volunteers): 3 May 1986.
 RAF Henlow: 26 September 1992.
 774th USAF Airbase Group: 15 December 1994.
 134 (Bedford) Squadron Air Training Corps: 1 August 1999.

See also
 List of places in Bedfordshire
 St Paul's Church, Bedford

References

External links

 
Local government districts of Bedfordshire
Local government in Bedfordshire
Unitary authority districts of England
English unitary authorities created in 2009
Boroughs in England